Remar may refer to:

 Remar Paşcani, a railway rolling stock company based in Paşcani, Romania
 Remarul 16 Februarie, a railway rolling stock company based in Cluj-Napoca, Romania